David Fitzgerald (born 8 October 1986) is an Irish hockey player. He plays for men's field hockey international. He was the reserve goalkeeper in the Ireland squad that won the bronze medal at the 2015 Men's EuroHockey Nations Championship. He was also in the squads that represented Ireland at the 2016 Summer Olympics and at the 2018 Men's Hockey World Cup. Between 2007–08 and 2016–17, Fitzgerald played in six Irish Senior Cup finals for Monkstown. He was also a member of the Monkstown team that won three successive Men's Irish Hockey League titles between 2012–13 and 2014–15. He was Goalkeeper of the Tournament when Monkstown won the 2014 EuroHockey Club Trophy.

Early years and education
Between 1999 and 2005 Fitzgerald attended St. Andrew's College.
Between 2007 and 2012 he attended University College Dublin where he gained a Bachelor's degree in Business and Law. In 2015–16 he gained a Certificate in Sport Psychology from Dún Laoghaire Institute of Art, Design and Technology.

Domestic teams

St. Andrew's College
In 2005 Fitzgerald, together with Alan Sothern, was a member of the St. Andrew's College team that lost 1–0 to Michael Darling and Wesley College in the Leinster Schools Senior Cup final.

Monkstown
Fitzgerald began playing field hockey with Monkstown at the age of nine. Between 2007–08 and 2016–17 he played in six Irish Senior Cup finals for Monkstown. In 2007–08, 2009–10 and 2010–11 he finished on the losing side.
In 2012–13 he helped Monkstown end their ninety nine year wait for an Irish Senior Cup title. Monkstown and Fitzgerald won the cup again in 2015–16  and were runners up in 2016–17. Together with Graham Shaw, Peter Caruth and Kyle Good, Fitzgerald also helped Monkstown win three successive Men's Irish Hockey League titles between 2012–13 and 2014–15. Fitzgerald has also represented Monkstown in European competitions. He was Goalkeeper of the Tournament when Monkstown won the 2014 EuroHockey Club Trophy and also played for Monkstown in the 2014–15
and the 2015–16 Euro Hockey Leagues.

Ireland international
Fitzgerald made his senior debut for Ireland in July 2010 against France. During the 2010s he was named as the reserve goalkeeper to David Harte in various Ireland tournament squads. Fitzgerald was a member of the Ireland team that won a 2012–13 Men's FIH Hockey World League Round 1 tournament. He was also a member of the Ireland squad that qualified for the 2016 Summer Olympics after finishing fifth in the 2014–15 Men's FIH Hockey World League Semifinals. In November 2018 he made his 50th senior Ireland appearance against the Netherlands.

Occupation
Since September 2013 he has worked as a specialist goalkeeping coach with Dublin University Ladies' Hockey Club. Since September 2014 he has worked as a self-employed personal trainer.

Honours
Ireland
Men's FIH Hockey World League Round 1
Winners: 2012 Cardiff
Men's FIH Hockey World League Round 2
Runners up: 2013 New Delhi
Monkstown
Men's Irish Hockey League
Winners: 2012–13, 2013–14, 2014–15: 3
Irish Senior Cup
Winners: 2012–13, 2015–16: 2
Runners up: 2007–08, 2009–10, 2010–11, 2016–17: 4
EuroHockey Club Trophy
Winners: 2014: 1
St. Andrew's College
Leinster Schools Senior Cup
Runners up: 2005: 1

References

1986 births
Living people
Irish male field hockey players
Irish field hockey coaches
Ireland international men's field hockey players
Olympic field hockey players of Ireland
Field hockey players at the 2016 Summer Olympics
2018 Men's Hockey World Cup players
Men's Irish Hockey League players
Monkstown Hockey Club players
Male field hockey goalkeepers
Field hockey players from County Dublin
Sportspeople from Dún Laoghaire–Rathdown
People educated at St Andrew's College, Dublin
Alumni of University College Dublin
People associated with Trinity College Dublin